Algazino (Alğazı) is a rural locality (a village) in Abdulkarimovsky Selsoviet, Baymaksky District, Bashkortostan, Russia. The population was 194 as of 2010. There are 2 streets.

Geography 
Algazino is located 51 km northeast of Baymak (the district's administrative centre) by road. Abdulkarimovo is the nearest rural locality.

References 

Rural localities in Baymaksky District